The Dún Laoghaire Harbour Police is a small, specialised police force in Dún Laoghaire, County Dublin, Ireland operating under the jurisdiction of the Dún Laoghaire Harbour Company.

The force has the power of arrest under Section 54 of the Harbours Act 1996 , to arrest persons in connection with offences under the Act, although they are then required to hand them over to the Garda Síochána. Prior to the passage of the Act, the Harbour Police were under the employ of the Department for the Marine and were sworn as constables under the Harbour, Docks & Piers Clauses Act 1847.

The force was established in 1836 as the Kingstown Harbour Police under the provisions of the Kingstown Harbour Act 1836, making it the oldest extant police force in Ireland. The current name was taken in 1924.

See also
 Dublin Harbour Police
 Dún Laoghaire Harbour

Specialist law enforcement agencies of the Republic of Ireland
Emergency services in the Republic of Ireland
Port law enforcement agencies